The Roman Walls which once surrounded Córdoba, Spain, were built after the Romans captured the city in 206 BC, making it part of the Roman Republic. The walls now form part of the historic center of Córdoba, a UNESCO World Heritage site.

Description

There were several semicircular towers along the walls. When the city received the status of Colonia Patricia under Augustus, the southern wall was demolished in order to extend the city limits to the river. Vestiges remain in the Alcázar, near the Roman bridge, and flanking the Avenida de la Ribera. The walls next to Calle San Fernando and Calle Cairuán (restored in the 1950s) also have a base from this period. A section of the Roman wall can be seen from the street next to the Roman temple

Roman gates included the Porta Principalis Sinistra (later Puerta de Gallegos) on the west side not far from the Roman mausoleum. The arches next to the Puerta de Sevilla to the east are part of a Roman aqueduct.

References

Historic centre of Córdoba, Spain
Roman sites in Spain
Roman fortifications in Hispania Tarraconensis
Córdoba
Roman walls in Spain